

Incumbents
Monarch: Alfonso XII until November 25

Events
March 7 - founding of the Roman Catholic Archdiocese of Madrid

Births
July 5 - Blas Infante

Deaths
November 25 - Alfonso XII

References

 
1880s in Spain